Rekha Surya (born 17 November 1959) is a Hindustani light classical singer.

Early life 
Rekha Surya was born in Lucknow to Inder Prakash Sur and Chand Sur. The couple migrated from Lahore to Lucknow during partition.

Education 
Surya did her initial schooling at Lucknow and later graduated from the Delhi University.

Professional journey 
Rekha Surya got her training from Begum Akhtar and Girija Devi. She also turned out to be Begum Akhtar's last student. After Akhtar's death, Surya went to Varanasi intermittently to learn from Girija Devi. She got a scholarship at the Sangeet Natak Academy in the 1980s where Devi, employed as a Guru, trained her. Veteran Sarangi player Bashir Khan was her other Guru.

Surya recorded for the archives of Sangeet Natak Academy (SNA) in 1994. She has written a booklet "Sung In A Certain Style" which was published by SNA.

She represented India at the Asian Music Festival, Sri Lanka (1999) and at the International Falak Festival, Tajikistan (2006). Surya has performed both in India and abroad.

The classical side 
Rekha Surya's style of singing revolves around Sringara Rasa, which connects her with mystical poetry. She sings Dadra, Kajri, Jhoola, Hori, Chaiti and Sufiana kalaam in Dadra and Ghazal style.

Awards 
Rekha Surya is a Karamveer Noble Laureate for 2012-13 under the category "Artistes 4 Change."

References

External links 

 Rubin Museum of Art & Indo-American Arts Council Present Rekha Surya in Concert
 Culture confluence
 CONTINUING THE LEGACY OF A LEGEND: REKHA SURYA
 The Sensual Voice of Rekha Surya
 Rekha Surya interviewed by Ashok Vajpeyi
 Kabul Diary
 INTACH organises evening of Hindustani light classical music
 Rekha Surya enthralls music lovers in Hyderabad
 Ghazal in its Authentic Form: Rekha Surya Performs at MIT
 APMC: AN EVENING WITH REKHA SURIYA
 Mera geet amar kar do ...

1959 births
Living people
21st-century Indian women classical singers
Indian women ghazal singers
Hindustani singers
Singers from Lucknow
Women Hindustani musicians
Women musicians from Uttar Pradesh
20th-century Indian women classical singers